The 2018–19 SMU Mustangs men's basketball team represented Southern Methodist University during the 2018–19 NCAA Division I men's basketball season. The Mustangs were led by third-year head coach Tim Jankovich and played their home games at Moody Coliseum on their campus in University Park, Texas as members of the American Athletic Conference. They finished the season 15–17, 6–12 in AAC play to finish in a tie for ninth place. They defeated Tulsa in the first round of the AAC tournament before losing in the quarterfinals to Cincinnati.

Previous season
The Mustangs finished the 2017–18 season 17–16, 6–12 in AAC play to finish in ninth place. In the AAC tournament, they defeated UConn before losing to Cincinnati in the quarterfinals.

Offseason

Departures

Incoming transfers

2018 recruiting class

Roster

Schedule and results

|-
!colspan=12 style=| Non-conference regular season

|-
!colspan=6 style=| AAC regular season

|-
!colspan=9 style=| AAC tournament

References

SMU Mustangs men's basketball seasons
Smu